Viramgam Junction railway station is located in Ahmedabad district of Gujarat state of India. It serves Viramgam town. Its code is VG. It comes under  division of Western Railway Zone. Passenger, Express and Superfast trains halt here.

History
During 19th century Viramgam railway station owned by BB&CI. During which Ahmedabad–Viramgam section was laid in 1871 by BB&CI. Later BB&CI line was extended to Wadhwan.

Railway reorganization

Bombay, Baroda and Central India Railway was merged into the Western Railway on 5 November 1951. Later gauge conversion of Ahmedabad–Viramgam section in 1969 and Viramgam–Hapa section has completed in 1980.

Features
It is on Gandhidham–Ahmedabad main line. About 40 trains pass through this station daily.

References

Railway stations in Ahmedabad district
Ahmedabad railway division
Railway junction stations in Gujarat
Railway stations opened in 1871